About intelligent life in the Universe, see:

 Life
 Extraterrestrial life#Evolution